Caballo de Troya: Caná, is the ninth and final book in the Caballo de Troya book series about the life of Jesus Christ, and published in 2011 by Spanish writer and journalist J. J. Benítez. It is, as said by the author himself, the final chapter on the series, which began with the first volume, Jerusalén, in 1984.

The book was published in Spain and Latin America by Planeta International.

Background
To write the entire series, Benítez travelled to more than 15 countries and searched through about 14.000 sources. Benítez also commented that he needed 218 days to write Caná, being the one that took the longest to write, and that it was a "very laborious" process, with the final draw having more than 1,100 pages.

Benítez, when asked about the material and sources he got to make the series, and the reason why he hasn't made them public, commented that if he reveals such information, "people will get distracted, and that's not the intention", also saying he doesn't know if he'll ever reveal such information.

He also comments, that when investigating the information, he found "a new Jesus, a divine and human creature" and "very different of what has been told".

Plot summary
In his ninth and final book about the public life of Jesus Christ, the journalist changes the past course of history and questions some of the affirmations given on the gospels such as the election of the 12 apostles; if Jesus burned all his writings and paintings; and that the prodigy of Caná were actually more impressive than was told.

Controversy
As with the past eight books of the Caballo de Troya series, controversy arose on the content Benítez had introduced in his books. As the last one, Caná also rose some controversy, on which Benítez commented: "Doubt is a concern for the most conservatory sectors, but then this country [Spain] has always been a little too much cainite".

Also, some have accused him of plagiarism when writing the series, for which Benítez had considered to be a "slander".

References

2011 books